Westmorland County (2016 population: 149,623) is a county in New Brunswick, a province of Canada. It is in the south-eastern part of the province. It contains the fast-growing commercial centre of Moncton and its northern and eastern suburbs. Also located in the county are the university town of Sackville and the tourist destination of Shediac.

Westmorland County is centrally located in the Maritimes and is New Brunswick's most populous county. Fishing and tourism are important industries along the Northumberland Strait shore, and there is some mixed farming in the Petitcodiac River Valley and in the Tantramar Marsh region. The city of Moncton accounts for half of the county's population and has developed as a major transportation, distribution, commercial and retail centre. Dorchester is the historic shire town.

Origins
The county, once a part of Cumberland County, Nova Scotia, was one of the original eight counties delineated shortly after the creation of the British colony of New Brunswick in 1784. Initially it included what is now Albert County and part of Saint John County.

Due to sweeping social reforms of the Louis Robichaud premiership, the counties no longer serve their role as regional local government and administrative units.

Transportation

Major highways

Census subdivisions

Communities
There are eleven municipalities within Westmorland County (listed by 2016 population):

First Nations
There is one First Nations reserve in Westmorland County (population as of 2016):

Parishes
The county is subdivided into seven parishes (listed by 2016 population):

Demographics

Language

Access routes
Highways and numbered routes that run through the county, including external routes that start or finish at the county limits:

Highways

Principal Routes

Secondary Routes:

External Routes:

Protected areas and attractions

Notable people

See also
List of communities in New Brunswick

References

External links
Westmorland County Guide

 
Counties of New Brunswick